Monsieur Robinson Crusoe (French: Robinson et le triporteur) is a 1960 French-Spanish comedy film directed by Jacques Pinoteau and starring Darry Cowl, Blanca de Silos and Alfredo Mayo.

Cast
 Darry Cowl as Antoine Peyralout  
 Blanca de Silos 
 Alfredo Mayo 
 Julio Peña 
 Elena Barrios 
 Teresa del Río 
 Billy Kearns
 Patrick MacGrady 
 Carlos Casaravilla
 Don Ziegler as Popeline's Father 
 Béatrice Altariba as Popeline 
 Edward Fleming
 Cándida Losada 
 Edy Silvain

References

Bibliography 
 Philippe Rège. Encyclopedia of French Film Directors, Volume 1. Scarecrow Press, 2009.

External links 
 

1960 comedy films
Spanish comedy films
1960 films
French comedy films
1960s French-language films
Films directed by Jacques Pinoteau
Films scored by Gérard Calvi
1960s Spanish films
1960s French films